Rahul Shivshankar (Hindi: राहुल शिवशंकर) (born 22 January 1975) is an Indian TV anchor who works as the editor-in-chief at Times Now. Before joining Times Now, Shivshankar worked in print and TV journalism. He has anchored five shows and has served as the Senior News Editor at Times Now (2005). Shivshankar worked very briefly with Headlines Today (since rebranded India Today) as the executive editor. He hosts the debate show India Upfront.

Career 

Shivshankar started his career in the mid-1990s as a print reporter. 

He was part of the launch team of Headlines Today in 2003, and shortly thereafter accepted the role of lead writer. He led the newsroom of the Headlines Today, where he worked as executive editor.

He was praised for his coverage of the 2008 Mumbai attacks, and contributed to a book about it.

In 2013, he moved to NewsX as the managing editor and anchor and a year later was elevated to the editor in chief. In 2014, the ENBA awarded NewsX as the "Best English News Channel of the Year." At NewsX, he has presented the shows Nation@9 and Insight.

Times Now 
Shivshankar was a part of the team that launched Times Now.

In 2016 he joined Times Now as editor-in-chief, replacing Arnab Goswami.

In June 2021, he was appointed editorial director by Times Network, where he also continued to lead the editorial mandate of the channel.

As of 2021, Shivshankar hosts India Upfront, a debate show on Times Now and he won Best Primetime Show (English) at the 13th ENBA Awards.

Besides India Upfront, Shivshankar also anchors four other shows, including The Breaking News Show and Live Report, and the one-hour weekend show Confront, which invites two panellists to debate on social and political topics concerning state issues, elections and the economy, and others. The show has featured Jay Panda, former Member of Parliament, Yogendra Yadav, National President of Swaraj India, Sudheendra Kulkarni, and Kanwal Sibal, former foreign secretary since its launch in 2018.

As of 2021, Shivshankar writes a monthly column for the editorial page of the Times of India.

In March 2022, a clip of one of his TV debates went viral on the internet. Shivshankar confused two of his guests and spent two minutes berating one of them until realising his mistake.

Lawsuits 
In 2020, the journalist Kanchan Srivastava filed a Rs 5 crore defamation suit against Shivshankar and Times Now's managing director Vineet Jain, accusing Shivshankar of defaming her by presenting her as "Rhea lobby" (supporter of the actor Rhea Chakraborty), on his India Upfront show.

Mamata Banerjee's nephew and Member of Parliament, Lok Sabha, Abhishek Banerjee lodged a case against Shivshankar for allegedly telecasting a 'defamatory' audiotape about him on Times Now news channel.

Reception
According to a BBC News article, several Indian news anchors including Shivshankar are known to shout down their panelists and ranting during their show, and have been accused of bias towards India's governing party, Bharatiya Janata Party and Prime Minister Narendra Modi.

In 2020, Newslaundry reported that Shivshankar had used several dog whistles to negatively portray the Indian Muslims.

Violation of Code of Ethics and Broadcasting Standards 
In 2021, the National Broadcasting and Digital Standards Authority (NBDSA) found that debates by two Times Now anchors (Rahul Shivshankar and Padmaja Joshi) on the topic 2020 Delhi riots were not conducted in an "impartial and objective manner". NBDSA found that the anchors had "violated the Fundamental Principles as enumerated in the Code of Ethics and Broadcasting Standards and various Guidelines issued by NBDSA". In his order NBDSA chairperson Justice (retired) A.K. Sikri directed Times Now to take down videos of from YouTube and websites. NBDSA had ordered this responding to the complaint filed against Shivshankar accusing him of selectively showing the observations of the courts and the police to make it appear as if the anti-Citizenship (Amendment) Act protestors were responsible for the religious violence. The order quoted, "The coverage was done to target a community that is critical of the Delhi Police’s investigation and project them and their critique in a negative light, thereby unduly hindering the right of the viewer to have a fact based view on the matter and amounted to a sustained campaign to challenge a position, without intimating to the viewers what that position is in its entirety or allowing panellists to explain the same".

References

External links 
 Rahul Shivshankar on Times Now

1975 births
Living people
20th-century Indian journalists
Indian television news anchors
The Times Group people